is an anime series based on a toy line by the Spain-based company Magic Box Int. Toys. It was originally set to launch in the winter of 2013. In Latin America, the series began streaming on Netflix on July 15, 2015. An English version of the show began airing November 23, 2015 on HBO Family Asia.

Production
In February 2011, Spanish toy manufacturer Magic Box Int. launched a line of collectible toys called Heroes: Legend of the Battle Disks in Europe.

In January 2013, Magic Box, in partnership with the Japanese studio Asahi Production, announced an anime adaptation set for broadcast in winter 2013. At the time, the series was expected to air in at least 28 markets, with the overall franchise expected to generate $370 million USD in revenue.
 
In September 2014, MarVista Entertainment acquired the global distribution rights to the series and debuted it at MIP Junior the following month. There it was revealed that the show would be directed by Masahiro Hosoda (Dragon Ball Z: Battle of Gods, Digimon Fusion), written by Junki Takegami (Naruto Shippuden the Movie, Hyakujuu Sentai Gaoranger) with character designs by Yoshihiro Nagamori (Bakugan, Beyblade), and available in 26 episodes x half-hour or 52 x thirteen minute formats. The show began airing in Latin America, South Africa and South East Asia in late 2015. The series officially debuted in the United States through Tubi TV on August 28, 2018.

Episodes

References

External links
 (Franchise portal)
 (Animated series)
Asahi Production page
HBO Family Asia

Asahi Production
2015 anime television series debuts